Vilho Väisälä (September 28, 1889 – August 12, 1969) was a Finnish meteorologist and physicist, and founder of Vaisala Oyj. 

After graduation in mathematics in 1912, Väisälä worked for the Finnish Meteorological Institute in aerological measurements, specializing in the research of the higher troposphere. At the time the measurements were conducted by attaching a thermograph to a kite.

In 1917 he published his dissertation in mathematics Ensimmäisen lajin elliptisen integralin käänteisfunktion yksikäsitteisyys (The single-valuedness of the inverse function of the elliptic integral of the first kind). His dissertation was the first and still is the only mathematical doctoral thesis written in the Finnish language.

Väisälä participated in development of radiosonde, a device attached to a balloon and launched to measure air in the higher atmosphere.  In 1936 he started his own company, manufacturing radiosondes and — later — other meteorological instruments. 

In 1948 Väisälä was nominated a Professor of Meteorology in the University of Helsinki.

Vilho Väisälä's two brothers, Kalle Väisälä and Yrjö Väisälä, also made successful careers in science.

Vilho Väisälä knew Esperanto, and played an active role in the Esperanto movement. During the World Congress of Esperanto of 1969, which was held in Helsinki shortly before his death, he served as the rector of the so-called Internacia Kongresa Universitato ("International Congressual University"), and coordinated the specialistic lectures in Esperanto given by various academicians to the congressists.

See also
Brunt–Väisälä frequency

References

External links
  

Finnish meteorologists
20th-century Finnish physicists
Academic staff of the University of Helsinki
Finnish Esperantists
1889 births
1969 deaths